This article refers to crime in the U.S. state of Arkansas.

Statistics
In 2008, there were 123,882 crimes reported in Arkansas, including 162 murders, 109,508 property crimes, and 1395 rapes.

Capital punishment laws

Capital punishment is applied in this state.

References